Kamon may refer to the following people:
Given name
, Japanese politician, governor of Tokushima Prefecture

Surname
Karen Kamon (born 1951), American singer and actress
, Japanese singer-songwriter

See also
Camon (surname)

Japanese-language surnames
Japanese masculine given names